Eliomar Marcon (born November 15, 1975 in Seberi, Rio Grande do Sul)  is a Brazilian striker as of 2008 playing for the Brazilian professional football club Nautico of the Brasileirao "Serie A".

Football career
On 31 January 2003, he was on loan to S.S.C. Venezia.

Mexico
He exploded onto the scene in the Apertura 2003 with 10 goals in 20 games leading his team to the repechaje where Tecos lost to Cruz Azul. He finished his career with Tecos with 40 goals in 102 games. After the Clausura 2006 he left Tecos UAG and signed with Santos Laguna for an undisclosed amount of money. Eliomar has struggled to find his place with Santos Laguna only scoring 4 goals in 30 games. In Apertura 2007 Marcon arrived to Indios de Ciudad Juarez as the premier booking of the season but after a few games into the season he was severely injured and was out for the rest of the 2007 Apertura in which Indios were champions.

External links
Profile at Footballplus.com (outdated)
 Brazilian FA Database

1975 births
Living people
Brazilian footballers
Association football forwards
Sportspeople from Rio Grande do Sul
Uruguayan Primera División players
Liga MX players
Serie B players
Defensor Sporting players
Santos Laguna footballers
Tecos F.C. footballers
Clube Náutico Capibaribe players
Venezia F.C. players
Brazilian expatriate footballers
Expatriate footballers in Italy
Expatriate footballers in Mexico
Expatriate footballers in Uruguay